The Albany Rural Cemetery was established October 7, 1844, in Colonie, New York, United States, just outside the city of Albany, New York. Many historical American figures are buried there.

History

On April 2, 1841, an association was formed to bring the cemetery into being. A committee of the association selected the site on April 20, 1844. The cemetery originally contained . This portion was consecrated October 7, 1844. Daniel D. Barnard delivered the dedication address, which was one of many given at rural cemeteries across the northeast in the years from Justice Joseph Story's address at Mount Auburn Cemetery in 1831 to Lincoln's Gettysburg Address in 1863. The first interment was made in May, 1845. Located near the entrance is the Louis Menand House.

David Bates Douglass, a military and civilian engineer, working in the capacity as a consulting architect, designed the landscape layout of Albany Rural Cemetery, between 1845 and 1846. He modeled his design of the Albany Rural Cemetery, as well as his subsequent and final one, Mount Hermon Cemetery, in a rural area outside of Quebec City, Canada East, upon his first design, the highly acclaimed Green-Wood Cemetery, in what at the time was a rural section of Brooklyn. All three of Douglass' garden cemeteries have been conferred a historic status, by their respective jurisdictions.

In 1868, bodies from other cemeteries were removed and reinterred in Albany Rural Cemetery.

Notable burials

 President Chester A. Arthur (1829–1886) – the 21st President of the United States, was interred with his wife Ellen Lewis Herndon Arthur, (1837–1880). His memorial was designed by Ephraim Keyser and dedicated on June 15, 1889. Friends of the former president contributed a fund that provided $10,000 for the memorial and for a statue that was erected in New York City.
 Alice Morgan Wright (1881–1975) – Modernist sculptor, co-founder of New York State League of Women Voters, Recording Secretary for Woman Suffrage Party, co-founder of the National Women's Party, and Founder of the Humane Education Society.
 Erastus Corning (1794–1872) – Founder and president of the New York Central Railroad.
 Erastus Corning 2nd (1909–1983) – Great-grandson of Erastus Corning and the mayor of Albany for 41 years. He is also in the Corning family plot.
 Anne Darling (1913–1991) – actress, best known as the shepherdess in Bride of Frankenstein.
 Charles Fort (1874–1932) – American writer and researcher who specialized in anomalous phenomena.
 Peter Gansevoort (1749–1812) – Colonel in the Continental Army and later a brigadier general in the US Army.  Known for leading the defense of Fort Stanwix during the Saratoga Campaign.
 Jack Gwillim (1909–2001) – English character actor.
 James Hall Jr. (1811–1898) geologist and paleontologist.
 Edward Burton Hughes (1905–1987) – Acting Commissioner of New York State Department of Transportation in 1969, Executive Deputy Commissioner of New York State Department of Transportation (1967–70), and Deputy Superintendent of New York State Department of Public Works (1952–1967). Upon his retirement in 1970 Hughes founded the E. Burton Hughes Achievement Award.
 Daniel Manning (1831–1887) – Journalist, politician and banker and served as Secretary of the Treasury under President Grover Cleveland.
 William Learned Marcy (1786–1857) – American statesman, who served as U.S. Senator, Governor of New York, U.S. Secretary of War and U.S. Secretary of State. When he died in 1857, relatives recalled that Marcy "frequently expressed the wish to be buried where he had spent so much time in reading and in contemplation".
 Erastus Dow Palmer (1817–1904) – Sculptor. He worked in an Albany studio producing statuary and portrait busts for many years before he died in 1904. He produced two statues which are displayed at the United States Capitol Building in Washington, D.C.; the Robert Livingston Statue and "Peace in Bondage". Several of Mr. Palmer's works adorn markers at the cemetery, one of which is titled "The Angel at the Sepulchre" – the Banks plot. Palmer also designed the granite monument at the grave of William Learned Marcy, U.S. Senator and three-term Governor of New York.
 William Paterson (1745–1806) – U.S. Senator and Governor of New Jersey and a signatory to the Constitution of the United States. Paterson ended his career as an Associate Justice of the Supreme Court, serving until his death. He is interred in the same plot as his son-in-law, Stephen Van Rensselaer.
 Rufus Wheeler Peckham (1809–1873) – New York Court of Appeals judge and U.S. congressman who was lost at sea. There is a cenotaph in his honor in the Peckham family plot.
 Rufus Wheeler Peckham (1838–1909) – associate justice of the Supreme Court of the United States (1895–1909) – in the Peckham family plot.
 Wheeler Hazard Peckham (1833–1905) – Prominent New York City lawyer and a failed nominee to the Supreme Court. He is buried in the Peckham family plot.
 Peggy Schuyler (1758–1801) – Sister-in-law to Alexander Hamilton.
 Philip Pieterse Schuyler (1628–1683) – progenitor of the Schuyler family, the Livingston family and the ancestor of the Bush family.
 Gilbert R. Spalding (1812–1880) – showman and circus owner in the Spalding and Robbins family plot.
 Ambrose Spencer (1765–1848) – New York lawyer, judge and politician, is also buried nearby.
 John Canfield Spencer (1788–1855) – Secretary of War and Secretary of the Treasury under President John Tyler and a failed nominee to the Supreme Court, buried in the Spencer family plot.
 Frances Starr (1886–1973) – American stage, film and television actress.
 Ebby Thacher (1896–1966) – an early member of Alcoholics Anonymous, the best friend and sponsor of the co-founder William Wilson (Bill W.)
 Franklin Townsend (1821–1898) – A 19th-century industrialist, active in his family's iron business which was a branch of the Stirling Iron Works, the maker of the Hudson River Chain that prevented the British Royal Navy from sailing up the Hudson River during the American Revolutionary War. He was active in Albany politics, serving as an alderman and one term as mayor of the city. He served as adjutant general of the state of New York from 1869 to 1873 and is interred with his wife.
 John Van Buren (1810–1866) – son of President Martin Van Buren. John Van Buren, a handsome attorney known as "Prince John", died at sea on October 13, 1866, while on the voyage from Liverpool to New York. His grave is marked by an Italian marble cross.
 General Stephen Van Rensselaer (1764–1839) – the last patroon, who died in 1839, was founder of the scientific school which later became Rensselaer Polytechnic Institute.
 Thomas Kirby Van Zandt (1814–1886) – a noted painter of horses.
 Thurlow Weed (1797–1882) – New York newspaper publisher and Whig and Republican politician; marked by a spire, corner lot.

Commemorations
 Philip Schuyler – A  doric column at Lot 2, Section 29 commemorates General Philip Schuyler, major general in the Continental Army, delegate to the Continental Congress, one of the first two United States senators elected from New York, and descendant of Philip Pieterse Schuyler.
 Two monuments within this cemetery incorporate works in bronze by the sculptor Oscar Lenz. Lenz created The Angel of The Resurrection and frieze on the Parsons family monument, as well as the relief of a seated warrior receiving a bouquet of poppies from the Angel of Death on George Porter Hilton's mausoleum.

Gallery

References

External links

 Albany Rural Cemetery official site
 List of public officials buried at Albany Rural Cemetery
 Burying the Dead in Early Albany
 
 Albany Rural Cemetery Explorer

Rural cemeteries
Cemeteries established in the 1840s
Cemeteries in Albany County, New York
Cemeteries on the National Register of Historic Places in New York (state)
History of Albany, New York
National Register of Historic Places in Albany County, New York
Tombs of presidents of the United States